The Peninsula 400 was a daily express passenger train operated by the Chicago and North Western Railway between Chicago and Ishpeming, in Michigan's Upper Peninsula. It operated as a named consist from 1942 to 1969. It was one of the railroad's 400 passenger trains, whose name stemmed from the original '400-mile, 400-minute' express operated by the railroad between Chicago and Minneapolis–St. Paul.

History 

Service began in 1942, and the Peninsula 400 quickly became a major hit, drawing more passengers than the far more prestigious Twin Cities 400 and commanding fourteen passenger cars when running south of Green Bay, Wisconsin. The train, numbered as 214–209 (depending on what direction it was going), was often pulled behind the North Western's lone ALCO DL-107 and an EMD E3 or E6. Unlike many of the other 400s, two engines were required due to the train's heavy patronage, which required lengthy consists. In 1943, for instance, the train averaged 662 passengers on its northbound run and 468 when headed back south. In all, the Peninsula 400 carried 674,299 total passengers in under two years of service.

By 1954, the railroad petitioned the Michigan Public Service Commission to abandon the Escanaba–Ishpeming portion of the route. The railroad claimed it lost $80,000 a year from continuing the train to Ishpeming. Even though eight years later the service required an additional five passenger cars during the holiday season, it still could not sustain a yearly profit. 

In October 1958 the Peninsula 400 received bilevel equipment including coaches, a lounge and a parlor car. This introduction marked the first time a North American passenger train used head end power (HEP) in preference to steam heat. Around this time, the train was featured in the 1959 film Anatomy of a Murder in scenes captured at the Ishpeming train station. Until some point in 1960 or 1961 the CNW ran a night train counterpart via Manitowoc, the Iron Country, with coaches, dining car, parlor car, tavern-lounge car, and a sleeper with accommodations ranging from roomettes to double bedrooms and a compartment. 

While the Commission did not allow the North Western to abandon the train in 1954, it reversed its position fifteen years later. As such, the Peninsula 400 made its last Chicago–Ishpeming run on July 15, 1969, and with it went the Chicago and Northwestern's "400" moniker. An unnamed remnant continued to run between Chicago and Green Bay until the formation of Amtrak on May 1, 1971. The Peninsula 400 remains the last regular passenger train to have serviced the Upper Peninsula; the area is now plied by intercity buses, and the nearest rail station for most UP residents is located 172 miles to the south of Marinette in Milwaukee, Wisconsin.

Accident
On January 31, 1949, in Rock, Michigan, the Peninsula 400 had an overheated bearing on a failed traction motor that caused a derailment. There was one death and 15 injured. A similar accident happened on January 11 to the Seaboard Coast Line Orange Blossom Special, which also had an overheated bearing on a traction motor on the diesel locomotive, which then seized and caused a derailment. There was one death and 76 injured. In both cases the overheated motor froze up, which caused the wheel to stop turning and wear down a flat spot, eventually derailing the trains.

References

Bibliography

Further reading 
Scribbins, Jim. The 400 Story: Chicago & North Western's Premier Passenger Trains. Minneapolis, MN: University of Minnesota Press, 2008. . .
 Howe, Ward Allen. "Rail Notes: New Fleet; Chicago & North Western Puts Time-Saving Diesel Streamliners Into Service." The New York Times. 22 February 1942. 3.

External links 
 1968 timetable
 American Rails

Passenger trains of the Chicago and North Western Railway
Named passenger trains of the United States
Passenger rail transportation in Illinois
Passenger rail transportation in Wisconsin
Passenger rail transportation in Michigan
Railway services introduced in 1942
Railway services discontinued in 1969